KBGT 93.3 FM is a radio station licensed to Buffalo Gap, Texas. The station broadcasts a Tejano music format and is owned by Extreme Media, LLC.

References

External links
KBGT's official website

BGT
Radio stations established in 2012
2012 establishments in Texas